The Fender Bandmaster was a musical instrument amplifier made by Fender. It was introduced in 1953 and discontinued in 1974. Some early models had both a microphone input and instrument inputs. Beginning in 1960, Bandmaster amps were equipped with a vibrato effect. In the 2000s, vintage Bandmaster amps remain in use by blues, Americana and rock and roll bands.

Timeline
Timeline gleaned from

Cosmetics
 Tweed
 Blonde
 Blackface
 Silverface 1967–1974
 Drip Edge 1967–1968
 Black Line 1967–

Circuit notes

5C7
The first Bandmaster was in all respects almost identical to the Fender Pro, a dual-6L6 26-watt amp with a 1x15 speaker, with one difference: separate treble and bass controls, where the Pro like all other Fender amps to that time only had a single "Tone" knob. Like the other larger Fender amps, the Bandmaster used cathode-biased 6L6G output tubes, a 6SC7 paraphase inverter, and two more 6SC7s in the preamp with a 5U4 rectifier.

5D7
The D-series circuits represented Fender's shift from octal preamp tubes, e.g. the 6SC7, to nine-pin mini-tubes of the 12A(n)7 family, as well as the introduction of the floating-paraphase inverter.

5E7
Negative feedback and filter choke added, and the output section given fixed (grid) rather than cathode bias. Phase inverter changed to cathodyne (concertina) type.

6G7 and 6G7-A
The 6G(n) ("brownface") circuit was used in several Fender amplifiers, including the Bandmaster. It produces 40 watts into 4 ohms. The circuit was used from 1960 until July 1963 when the "AB763" circuit was introduced. "Blonde" aficionados feel this circuit has superior tonal characteristics when overdriven, to the AB763 circuit. The 6G7 and revised 7-A circuit used the long-tail pair phase inverter introduced with the 1957 Bassman, used a solid-state rather than a tube rectifier, and also included a vibrato that is heralded as Fender's best by many enthusiasts. Power tubes were now 5881s (6L6WGBs). The new model was covered in Tolex rather than "tweed;" still a combo in brown Tolex for 1960, and then a blonde-covered head-and-cab piggyback 1961-63.

AA/AB763
The AA763 (July 1963) and improved AB763 (March 1964) ("blackface") circuit is arguably considered the "best" circuit version produced for this amp by collectors and aficionados. The complex brownface "harmonic vibrato", however, was replaced by a simpler electro-optic oscillator. Power tubes were the even beefier 6L6GC. Some 1964 blackface Showmen were still covered in blonde Tolex rather than the usual black. Later "silverface" amps retrofitted to this circuitry are described as having been "blackfaced," a reference to the black faceplate used on these amps during much of this era.

AA568
The AA568 version (introduced May, 1968) was met with popular dislike by Fender's customers. It is referred to at times as the "silverface" circuit, referring to the brushed aluminum control plate used from 1968 to 1974. The circuit and cosmetic changes didn't happen at the same time; some 1967 and early 1968 Bandmasters still possessed the blackface AB763 circuitry.

Unfortunately, the tube chart inside the amp head cannot be reliably used to differentiate the AB763 from the later circuits, as Fender continued using the older tube charts for a while after changing the circuit configuration.

AA1069
Some of the changes from the AA568 were reverted in October, 1969, yielding the AA1069 circuit, but many of the changes remained in place.

See also
Bandmaster Reverb
Fender

References

Instrument amplifiers
B
Musical instruments invented in the 1950s